The Ministry of Maritime Affairs, previously known as the Ministry of Ports and Shipping, is a Federal Ministry of the Government of Pakistan. The current Minister for Maritime Affairs is Faisal Subzwari and the current Federal Secretary for Maritime Affairs is Mathar Niaz Rana.
The Ministry is headquartered in Islamabad and its main attached departments are in the port city of Karachi.

Hierarchy
The Ministry is headed by the Maritime Secretary of Pakistan. Keeping in view its close links with the seaports, a division of the Ministry of Maritime Affairs is established in Karachi which includes a number of attached departments/organisations each headed by a high-grade civil servant or bureaucrat.

Wings and attached departments

Government Shipping Office
Karachi Port Trust
Korangi Fish Harbour
Marine Fisheries Department
Mercantile Marine Department
Pakistan Marine Academy
Pakistan National Shipping Corporation
Gwadar Port Authority
Port Qasim Authority
Ports and Shipping Wing, Karachi

History
Before 2004, Ports and Shipping was a subject and part of the Ministry of Communications.
In 2004, the Ministry of Ports and Shipping emerged as a separate and independent Federal Ministry of the Government of Pakistan.
In October 2017, the Ministry was again restructured and renamed as Ministry of Maritime Affairs.

Role of Ministry 
The Ministry officials look over the administrative and policy matters of the Federal Ministry including policies, procedures, rules and regulations. Apart from that, the attached wings and departments established in Karachi deal with their respective domains under the administration of the Federal Ministry of Maritime Affairs.

See also 
 List of ports in Pakistan
 Economy of Pakistan
 Pakistan Merchant Navy
 Pakistan Merchant Shipping Ordinance 2001
 Port of Karachi
 Gwadar Port
 Master Mariner
 Shipping Master
Pakistan Islands Development Authority

References

External links
 
 Official Site of Government Shipping Office
 Official Site of Pakistan Marine Academy
 Official Site of Pakistan National Shipping Corporation
 Official Site of Port Qasim Authority
 Official Site of Karachi Port Trust
 Official Site of Gawadar Port Authority

Ports and Shipping
Pakistan, Ports and Shipping
Shipping in Pakistan
Transport organisations based in Pakistan